Sundavi is a town  in Puran Tehsil, Shangla District in the Khyber Pakhtunkhwa of Pakistan. 

People from the Babozai sub-sections Ado Khel and Musa Khel live in the town, District leader of Shangla Ayub Khan  of the Awami National Party is from Sundavi. The prominent advocate RAHIM ZADA (the brother of great hakeem Gul Zada) puran bar at law also belong to sundavi. In local government system Sundavi is given the status of a Village and its own Village Council will be elected. Ganourai, Faiza, Makra, Shwar and Allagram are the neighbouring small villages which are included in the Village Council Sundavi.

Cities and towns in Shangla District